The prix Contrepoint is a French literary award established in 1971 by a group of young French novelists and journalists. Each year a French-speaking novelist is selected.

According to Bertrand Labes, this prize was characterized at its creation as the "Goncourt of young writers" as its recipients often confirmed their talent later on.

The jury included Christian Giudicelli, Dominique-Pierre Larger, Patrick Modiano, Claude Montcalm, Louis-Antoine Prat, Gonzague Saint Bris, Jean-Clément Texier, and Denys Viat.

This award is distinguished by the fact that, according to its rules, the winner must pay a one Franc check to each of the eight members of the jury, "for the pains taken to read his work."

List of laureates 
 1972: Elvire de Brissac for Un long mois de septembre (Grasset)
 1973: Bernard Matignon for Les Soldats de bois (Fayard)
 1974: Raphaële Billetdoux for L'Ouverture des bras de l'homme (Seuil)
 1975: Michel Alvès for Le Territoire (Jean-Jacques Pauvert)
 1976: Jack-Alain Léger for Un ciel si fragile
 1977: Christian Giudicelli for Les Insulaires (Seuil)
 1978: Catherine Rihoit for Portrait de Gabriel (Gallimard)
 1979: Olivier Beer for Le Chant des enfants morts (Albin Michel)
 1980: Jérôme Hesse for Surprenante Histoire d'un jeune homme de bonne famille (Grasset)
 1981: Jean-François Ferrané for Le Miroir de pierre (Flammarion)
 1983: Gérard Pussey for L'Amour tombé du lit (Denoël)
 1984: Catherine David for L'Océan miniature (Seuil)
 1985: Thierry de Beaucé for La Chute de Tanger (Gallimard)
 1986: Marie Nimier for Sirène (Gallimard)
 1987: Élisabeth Barillé for Corps de jeune fille (Gallimard)
 1988: Lydie Locatelli for Cent mètres d'amour avec haies et obstacles (Albin Michel)
 1989: Gonzague Saint Bris for La Fayette, la Stature de la Liberté
 1990: Régine Michel for Les Petits Mensonges
 1991: Ya Ding for Le Jeu de l'eau et du feu (Flammarion)
 1992: Nino Ricci for Les Yeux bleus et le Serpent (Denoël)
 1993: Jean-Olivier Tedesco for Le Diable et le Condottiere (Grasset)
 1994: Louise Anne Bouchard for La Fureur
 1996: Justine Lévy for Le Rendez-vous (Plon)
 1997: Robert de Goulaine for Du côté de Zanzibar
 1998: Jacques-Pierre Amette for Les Deux Léopards (Seuil)
 1999: Sylvie Derveloy for Un cœur à l'envers
 2000: Claire Castillon for Le Grenier
 2001: Anna Gavalda for Je voudrais que quelqu'un m'attende quelque part
 2002: Anne-Sophie Brasme for Respire (Fayard)
 2003: Émilie Frèche for Une femme normale
 2004: Bénédicte Martin for Warm up (Flammarion)
 2005: Constance Debré for Un peu là beaucoup ailleurs (éditions du Rocher)
 2006: Emmanuelle Heidsieck for Notre aimable clientèle (Denoël)
 2007: Géraldine Maillet for Presque top model (Flammarion)
 2008: Alessandra Fra for Un suicide (L'Harmattan)
 2009: Diane de Margerie for La passion Brando (Albin Michel)
 2010: Valérie de Changy for Fils de Rabelais
 2011: Capucine Motte for La vraie vie des jolies filles (JC Lattès)
 2012: Anne Plantagenet for Nation Pigalle (Éditions Stock)
 2013: Nathalie Rheims for Laisser les cendres s'envoler
 2014: Mathilde Janin for Riviera (Actes Sud)
 2015: As a tribute to and respect for the 2015 Nobel Prize in Literature, awarded to one of its founding members, Patrick Modiano, the jury decided not to award the Prix Contrepoint 2015.
 2016: Alessia Valli for La Nostalgie du Crépuscule
 2017: Isabelle Spaak for  Ça ne se fait pas and Une allure folle (Éditions des Équateurs)
 2018: No award in memory of juror Gonzague Saint Bris, who died in 2017.
 2019: Marion Ruggieri for Donne-moi la main pour traverser (Éditions Grasset) and Clarisse Gorokhoff for Casse-Gueule (Gallimard)
 2020: Laure Pfeffer for Si peu la fin du monde (Buchet-Chastel) and Marie-Hélène Lafon for Le pays d'en haut (Arthaud)

References

External links 
 Prix Contrepoint de littérature 2016 on Livres Hebdo
 Mathilde Janin reçoit le Prix Contrepoint de littérature française 2014 on Actes Sud
 Prix Contrepoint de Littérature Française on Prix Littéraires.net

French literary awards
Awards established in 1971
1971 establishments in France